Thornton Lane railway station served the village of Thornton, Leicestershire, England, from 1850 to 1865 on the Leicester and Swannington Railway.

History
The station was opened in 1850 by the Midland Railway. It was only used on Saturdays. It closed on 1 October 1865.

References

Transport in Leicester
Disused railway stations in Leicestershire
Former Midland Railway stations
Railway stations in Great Britain opened in 1850
Railway stations in Great Britain closed in 1865
1850 establishments in England
1865 disestablishments in the United Kingdom